Ricardo Soundy (born 3 January 1948) is a Salvadoran former sports shooter. He competed in the skeet event at the 1968 Summer Olympics.

References

1948 births
Living people
Salvadoran male sport shooters
Olympic shooters of El Salvador
Shooters at the 1968 Summer Olympics
Sportspeople from San Salvador